Omphale cornula is a species of wasp in the family Eulophidae.

References

Eulophidae